The Legend and the Legacy is a compilation album by American country singer Ernest Tubb, released in 1979. The initial release was issued on LP as The Legend and the Legacy Volume 1. It was released on First Generation Records, but due to legal issues, was withdrawn and released on Cachet Records.

History
Producer and pedal steel guitar artist Pete Drake brought Tubb and his current line-up of the Texas Troubadours into the recording studio to record basic tracks in 1977. Unknown to Tubb, Drake later secretly brought in other famous country music singers and musicians to overdub vocals and instruments to the already recorded tracks. Special guests included such artists as Chet Atkins, Johnny Cash, Merle Haggard, Loretta Lynn, Willie Nelson, Johnny Paycheck, Ferlin Husky, Waylon Jennings, George Jones, Marty Robbins, Conway Twitty, Charlie Rich and many others.

Drake intended two issues of the material recorded—hence the Volume 1—but due to poor distribution and sales, the album quickly went out of print. Subsequent reissues on CD included additional tracks.

It was reissued again on the 20th anniversary of its release in 1999 by First Generation Records in a limited run. The Pete Drake Music Group recently made the project available as a download or physical CD via Drake's First Generation Records online store at Bandcamp.

Reception

In his Allmusic review, Eugene Chadbourne said, "The highest possible rating for this project reflects its brilliance as a grand statement about country & western music, especially the incredible loyalty its artists have toward historic figures in the genre."

Track listing

Side one
"Waltz Across Texas" with Willie Nelson (Talmadge Tubb) – 2:36
"Half a Mind" with George Jones (Roger Miller) – 2:35
"Thanks a Lot" with Loretta Lynn (Eddie Miller, Don Sessions) – 2:35
 "Jealous Loving Heart" with Johnny Cash (Talmadge Tubb, Ernest Tubb) – 1:58
 "Journey's End" with Marty Robbins and the Wilburn Bros. (Ernest Tubb, Pappy Stewart) – 2:41
 "Set up Two Glasses, Joe" with Ferlin Husky and Simon Crum (Cindy Walker) – 2:12

Side two
 "Walking the Floor Over You" with Merle Haggard and Charlie Daniels (Ernest Tubb) – 2:02
 "You're the Only Good Thing (That's Happened to Me)" with Charlie Rich (Jack Toombs) – 2:32
 "The Women Make a Fool Out of Me" with Conway Twitty (Jimmie Rodgers) – 2:42
 "Let's Say Goodbye Like We Said Hello" with Johnny Paycheck (Ernest Tubb, Jimmie Skinner) – 3:06
 "Blue Eyed Elaine" with Justin Tubb (Ernest Tubb) – 2:54
 "Our Baby's Book" with Cal Smith (Ernest Tubb) – 3:00

1999 Reissue track listing
"Waltz Across Texas" (T. Tubb, E. Tubb) – 2:38
 "When the World Has Turned You Down" (E. Tubb) – 3:12
 "Let's Say Goodbye Like We Said Hello" (E. Tubb, Jimmie Skinner) – 3:09
 "Answer the Phone" (Cindy Walker) – 2:31
 "Journey's End" (Tubb, Pappy Stewart) – 2:45
 "Walking the Floor Over You" (E. Tubb) – 2:05
"Half a Mind" (Roger Miller) – 2:39
 "Jealous Loving Heart" (T. Tubb, E. Tubb) – 2:03
 "Rainbow at Midnight" (Lost John Miller) – 3:17
 "Set up Two Glasses, Joe" (Walker) – 2:17
 "You Nearly Lose Your Mind" (E. Tubb) – 2:47
 "You're the Only Good Thing (That's Happened to Me)" (Jack Toombs, Chuck Gregory) – 2:39
 "Filipino Baby" (Billy Cox, Clarke Van Ness) – 3:10
 "The Women Make a Fool Out of Me" (Rodgers) – 2:45
 "Seaman's Blues" (T. Tubb, E. Tubb) – 3:05
"Thanks a Lot" (Eddie Miller, Don Sessions) – 2:42
 "It's Been So Long, Darling" (E. Tubb) – 3:12
 "Blue Eyed Elaine" (E. Tubb) – 2:58
 "Our Baby's Book" (E. Tubb) – 3:06
 "Soldiers Last Letter" (Redd Stewart, E. Tubb) – 3:28

Chart positions

Personnel
Ernest Tubb – vocals, guitar
Johnny Cash – vocals ("Jealous Loving Heart")
Merle Haggard – vocals, guitar ("Walking the Floor Over You")
Loretta Lynn – vocals ("Thanks a Lot", "Answer the Phone")
Willie Nelson – vocals ("Waltz Across Texas", "You Nearly Lose Your Mind")
Gary Paxton – vocals
Johnny Paycheck – vocals ("Let's Say Goodbye Like We Said Hello")
Ferlin Husky – vocals ("Set up Two Glasses, Joe")
Waylon Jennings – vocals ("You Nearly Lose Your Mind")
George Jones – vocals ("Half a Mind")
Mary Ann Kennedy – vocals
Simon Crum – vocals ("Set up Two Glasses, Joe")
Linda Hargrove – vocals
Tim Boone – vocals
Marty Robbins – vocals ("Journey's End")
Pamela Rose – vocals
Cal Smith – vocals ("Our Baby's Book")
Carmol Taylor – vocals
Justin Tubb – vocals ("Blue Eyed Elaine")
Conway Twitty – vocals ("The Women Make a Fool Out of Me")
The Wilburn Brothers – vocals ("Journey's End")
Norro Wilson – vocals
Charlie Rich – vocals ("You're the Only Good Thing")
Charlie Daniels – vocals, guitar
Johnny Cox – pedal steel guitar
Jimmy Crawford – pedal steel guitar
Pete Drake – pedal steel guitar
Buddy Emmons – pedal steel guitar
Speedy West – pedal steel guitar
Lynn Owsley – pedal steel guitar
Chet Atkins – guitar
Phil Baugh – guitar
Ronald Blackwell – guitar
Harold Bradley – guitar
Billy Byrd – guitar
Jimmy Capps – guitar
Ray Edenton – guitar
Wayne Hammond – guitar
Tommy Hill – guitar
Jerry Kennedy – guitar
Grady Martin – guitar
Rusty Adams – guitar
Tommy Allsup – guitar
Pete Mitchell – guitar
Robert Rector – guitar
Billy Sanford – guitar
Dale Sellers – guitar
Jerry Shook – guitar
Jack Solomon – guitar
Reggie Young – guitar
Pete Wade – guitar
Billy Grammer – guitar
Shorty Lavender – fiddle
Owen Bradley – piano
David Briggs – piano
Jerry Carrigan – drums
Hayword Bishop – drums
Charlie McCoy – harmonica
Bob Moore – bass
Joe Pruneda Jr. – bass
Billy Linneman – bass
Larry Emmons – bass
Henry Strzelecki – bass
George Richey – piano
Hargus "Pig" Robbins – piano
Jeffrey M. Tweel – piano

References

External links
Pete Drake and First Generation Records
 The Legend and The Legacy at Bandcamp

1979 compilation albums
Ernest Tubb compilation albums